FC Orto-Nur Sokuluk is a Kyrgyzstani football club based in Sokuluk, Kyrgyzstan that played in the top division in Kyrgyzstan, the Kyrgyzstan League.

History 
1990: Founded as FC Dostuk Sokuluk.
1992: Renamed FC SKA-Dostuk Sokuluk.
1998: Renamed FC Dinamo Sokuluk.
1999: Renamed FC Frunze Sokuluk.
2003: Renamed FC Orto-Nur Sokuluk.
2004: Dissolved.

Achievements 
Kyrgyzstan League:
Runner-up: 1992

Current squad

External links 
Career stats by KLISF

Football clubs in Kyrgyzstan
1990 establishments in the Kirghiz Soviet Socialist Republic
2004 disestablishments in Kyrgyzstan